Pentephyle, also possibly known as Triknaita, was an inland town of ancient Bithynia inhabited during Roman times.

Its site is tentatively located near Gügüşler in Asiatic Turkey.

References

Populated places in Bithynia
Former populated places in Turkey
History of Kocaeli Province
Roman towns and cities in Turkey